Cuddalore block is a revenue block of Cuddalore district of the Indian state of Tamil Nadu. This revenue block consist of 51 panchayat villages.

List of Panchayat Villages 
They are,

References 

Revenue blocks of Cuddalore district